Tomorrow Is Here is an album by American jazz percussionist Willie Bobo recorded in late 1976 and early 1977 and released on the Blue Note label.

Reception

The AllMusic review by Richard S. Ginell states "Tomorrow Is Here has a pronounced '70s R&B/funk feel, with synthesizers, envelope followers, electric pianos, guitars and occasional strings interwoven with Bobo's steady Latin congas, timbales and self-effacing vocals. But there are a few gems to be found here".

Track listing
 "Suitcase Full Of Dreams" - 3:48 	
 "Funk De Mambo" - 3:17 	
 "Keep On Walking" - 4:28 	
 "Dreamin'" - 5:08 	
 "Wacky Tobacky (The Race)" - 2:58 	
 "Can't Stay Down Too Long" - 3:29 	
 "Time After Time" - 3:16 	
 "Kojak Theme" - 3:33 	
 "A Little Tear" - 4:53
Recorded at Oceanway Studios in Los Angeles, California between October, 1976 and January, 1977.

Personnel
Willie Bobo - vocals, percussion
Gary Grant, Ron King, Nolan Smith - trumpet
George Bohanon, Thurman Green - trombone
Ray Pizzi, Ernie Watts - saxophone
Gary Herbig - reeds
Reggie Andrews, Larry Farrow, David Garfield - keyboards
Dennis Budimir, John Cadrecha, Craig McMullen, Sidney Muldrow, Curtis Robertson Jr. - guitar
Dean Cortez, Jim Hughart, David Troncoso - bass
Gary Denton, James Gadson, Jeff Porcaro, Carlos Vega - drums
Victor Pantoja - percussion
Sandi Erwin, Benard Ighner - vocals

References

Blue Note Records albums
Willie Bobo albums
1977 albums